Mudasir Rehman Dar (born 1992), also known as Shahid Mudasir, is a sketch artist from Kashmir. He is known for his miniature painting art and for creating the world’s smallest painting of Kaaba on a leaf, a ring, and a pencil lead. In 2021, he has been named in the India Book of Records as well as the Asia Book of Records in recognition of his work.

Career

Dar is known for miniature painting art after he created painting of Kaaba on a ring, a leaf and a pencil lead. He also make abstract art, paintings, modern art, contemporary art, sketching, landscapes, Islamic art, calligraphy, social art, and other portraits across the Kashmir valley.

Dar's most of the art is on Kashmir-related tales. In 2007, when Dar's cousin died, he started drawing and illustrating why youth are forced to pick up arms, why people die, and how they live their everyday lives.

In 2016, after the death of Burhan Wani, he was forced by security forces to take down a sketched image of Wani from social media after it went viral.

After 2019, Dar draws on different themes of social issues like drug addiction, rape, child abuse, and child labour.

, Dar created atleast 400 paintings.

Awards and recognition

In 2021, Dar was named in the Asian Book of Records and the Indian Book of Records for making the world’s smallest painting. He became the first artist from Kashmir to secure this place in history.

Personal life

Dar was born in 1992 in Kulpora village in Kulgam district. He dropped out of school at the secondary level and became a daily-wage worker to support his father. He currently works as a painter.

References

1992 births
Living people
Indian male painters
20th-century Indian painters
Painters from Jammu and Kashmir